Eupithecia analoga is a moth of the family Geometridae. The species can be found from western Europe to the Ural and Siberia.  In the north, the range extends north of the polar circle. South, it is found up to the Alps.

The wingspan is 17–21 mm. There is one generation per year with adults on wing from the beginning of May to mid July.

The larvae feed on Picea species. They live on galls produced by Aphids. Pupation also takes place in these galls. Larvae can be found from June to August. It overwinters as a pupa.

Subspecies
Eupithecia analoga analoga
Eupithecia analoga nageli (Skala, 1929)

References

External links

Fauna Europaea
Lepiforum.de
Swedish Moths

Moths described in 1926
analoga
Moths of Europe
Moths of Asia
Taxa named by Alexey Diakonoff